The American Theater Hall of Fame in New York City was founded in 1972. Earl Blackwell was the first head of the organization's Executive Committee. In an announcement in 1972, he said that the new Theater Hall of Fame would be located in the Uris Theatre (then under construction, now the Gershwin). James M. Nederlander and Gerard Oestreicher, who leased the theater, donated the space for the Hall of Fame; Arnold Weissberger was another founder. Blackwell noted that the names of the first honorees would "be embossed in bronze-gold lettering on the theater's entrance walls flanking its grand staircase and escalator."  The first group of inductees was announced in October 1972.

Eligible inductees come from disciplines including actors, playwrights, songwriters, designers, directors, and producers who have had a career in American theater for at least twenty-five years and at least five major production credits on Broadway. Selections are made each year by voting members of the Theater Hall of Fame and the American Theatre Critics Association (ATCA). Induction takes place at a ceremony at the Gershwin Theatre in New York City, where the plaques containing the names of the inductees are hung.

Since 1998, full accounts of the annual induction ceremonies, with quotes from both inductees and their presenters, have appeared in the Pittsburgh Post-Gazette. An index to these articles is on the ATCA website. An annual Theater Hall of Fame Fellowship Luncheon has been held annually since 2004 to salute a member "who continues to work on Broadway and also presents grants to emerging theatre artists."

Inductees

Original members
The following is a list of the original members of the Hall of Fame. For other members, see the full list at the Hall of Fame official website. 

George Abbott
Judith Anderson
Fred Astaire
Pearl Bailey
Tallulah Bankhead
Ethel Barrymore
John Barrymore
Lionel Barrymore
Norman Bel Geddes
Irving Berlin
Leonard Bernstein
Edwin Booth
Katharine Cornell
Noël Coward
Lynn Fontanne
Eva Le Gallienne
George Gershwin
Ira Gershwin
Lillian Gish
Oscar Hammerstein II
Moss Hart
Helen Hayes
Gertrude Lawrence
Frank Loesser
Alfred Lunt
Ethel Merman
George Jean Nathan
Eugene O'Neill
Richard Rodgers
Laurette Taylor
Tennessee Williams

Founders Award
An annual Theater Hall of Fame Founders Award, established in 1993 in honor of the 3 founders, recognizes an individual's outstanding contribution to the theatre.

Recipients:

1993 James Nederlander
1994 Kitty Carlisle Hart
1995 Harvey Sabinson
1996 Henry Hewes
1997 Otis L. Guernsey Jr.
1998 Edward Colton
1999 (No award)
2000 Gerard Oestreicher
2000 Arnold Weissberger
2001 Tom Dillon
2002 (No award)
2003 Price Berkley
2004 (No award)
2005 Donald Seawell
2007 Roy A. Somlyo
2008 Shirley Herz

Notes

External links
Official web site
January 2008 inductees
October 2008 inductees
January 2011 inductees
October 2012 inductees
January 2014 inductees
May 2015 inductees
November 2015 inductees
September 2016 inductees

Broadway theatre
Theatre
Entertainment halls of fame
Awards established in 1972
1972 establishments in New York City
American theater awards